Ex-Girlfriends' Club is a 2015 South Korean television series starring Byun Yo-han, Song Ji-hyo, Lee Yoon-ji, Jang Ji-eun and Ryu Hwayoung. It aired on tvN from May 8 to June 13, 2015 on Fridays and Saturdays at 20:30 for 12 episodes.

Originally scheduled for 16 episodes, the series was cut down to 12 episodes when ratings proved disappointing.

Plot
Bang Myung-soo is a popular writer of webtoons. He then writes a webtoon series about his past relationships, specifically his three ex-girlfriends, which includes an older, wealthy divorcee, a chic and successful woman who works at an investment firm, and a third-rate, airhead actress. The webtoon reveals plenty of details about Myung-soo's love life, and it becomes a huge hit. Soon, Myung-soo is considered a cross between Public Enemy Number One and National Heartthrob, and his webtoon gets adapted into a movie.

Kim Soo-jin is a film producer who's prepared to do whatever it takes to save their failing production company. Because of this, she accepts the assignment to produce a webtoon adaptation. But to her horror, Soo-jin belatedly finds out that the webtoon artist is her ex-boyfriend Myung-soo, who is writing about his ex-girlfriends. And as the movie starts shooting, the project also brings Myung-soo's other ex-girlfriends back into his life all at the same time.

Cast

Main
Song Ji-hyo as Kim Soo-jin (32)
Byun Yo-han as Bang Myung-soo (32)
Jang Ji-eun as Na Ji-ah (34, Myung-soo's first love)
Lee Yoon-ji as Jang Hwa-young (32, Myung-soo's third love)
Ryu Hwa-young as Goo Geun-hyung/Ra Ra (27, Myung-soo's second love)

Extended Cast
Do Sang-woo as Jo Gun (35)
Jo Jung-chi as Choi Ji-hoon (32, Soo-kyung's husband)
Shin Dong-mi as Kim Soo-kyung (34, Soo-jin's elder sister)
Kang Soo-jin as Song Eun-hye (27)
Go Hyun as Lee Jin-bae (27, Cartoonist)
Park Pal-young
Son Jong-hak
Choi Seung-hoon as Seong-hyeon (Soo-jin's nephew)
Chae Jung-an as Baek Soo-hee (cameo, ep 1)

Ratings
In this table,  represent the lowest ratings and  represent the highest ratings.

International broadcast

References

External links
 

TVN (South Korean TV channel) television dramas
2015 South Korean television series debuts
Korean-language television shows
South Korean romantic comedy television series
Television series by JS Pictures